Miriam Joy Cates (born 23 August 1982) is a British Conservative Party politician who was elected as the Member of Parliament (MP) for Penistone and Stocksbridge at the 2019 general election. Prior to her parliamentary career, she was the finance director of a technology consultancy, teacher, and a parish councillor.

Early life
Cates was born in Sheffield, South Yorkshire, England, and attended King Edward VII School. Cates grew up in a Christian family and has two younger brothers. Her father is a retired general practitioner. Cates reports an early interest in politics from the age of 11 which included listening to the Today programme on the radio. She studied genetics at the University of Cambridge, obtained a Postgraduate Certificate in Education from Sheffield Hallam University, and worked as a science teacher at Tapton School in Sheffield. She then became the finance director of the technology consultancy, Redemption Media. Cates co-owns the company with her husband.

Political career

Local councillor
Cates was elected in 2015 as a parish councillor for Oughtibridge Ward on Bradfield Parish Council. She was re-elected in 2019 and resigned her seat in 2021. Cates stood as a Conservative candidate for Stannington ward in the 2018 Sheffield City Council election and joined the party in the same year. She received 898 votes and finished third behind the Liberal Democrats candidates.

Member of Parliament
Cates was selected as the Conservative candidate for Penistone and Stocksbridge on 24 October 2018. She had previously supported the UK remaining a member of the European Union in the 2016 referendum but, during the election campaign, commented she had since changed her mind and supported Brexit. Cates was elected as MP in the 2019 general election with a majority of 7,210 (14.5%) on a swing of 8.6% from Labour to the Conservatives.

After her election, it was reported that a mobile app was launched in 2014 by Redemption Media, a company co-owned by Cates and her husband, charged foodbanks for the services that it provided. Cates commented on this by stating that the app had been developed for free, and that the first foodbank to use it had not been charged. After the app was expanded to other foodbanks, there was a set-up charge which was used to help cover development and training costs, and that by joining the app they also received a complimentary subscription to JustGiving. The first client of the app was the S6 Foodbank based at St. Thomas' Church and run by Network Church Sheffield. They piloted the app in 2012 before its national launch in 2014. Cates and her family were members of St. Thomas' Church and she was the operations director of Network Church Sheffield from 2016 to 2018.

Cates has been a member of the Ecclesiastical Committee since March 2020 and the Education Select Committee since October 2021. She also co-chairs the Stocksbridge Towns Fund with local property developer Mark Dransfield. She was elected to the 1922 Committee on 11 July 2022.

Cates established the New Social Covenant Unit with fellow Conservative MP Danny Kruger in 2021 with the principle purpose of promoting policy that would "strengthen families, communities, and the nation".

In June 2021, in an article for online magazine UnHerd, Cates criticised the focus on protecting the elderly during the COVID-19 pandemic as in her opinion it only had a short-term impact on the "longevity of older people" and that emphasis should have been on "the long term impact of lockdowns on young peoples' lives".

In October 2021, she wrote an article in The Daily Telegraph where Cates stated it "eroded" the rights of women to say that trans women were women. When asked about the article in an interview for GB News, she said that she did not oppose trans women who had undergone sex reassignment therapy from having equivalent rights, but did oppose self-identification and gender fluidity as she felt that it "posed a danger" to women. In November 2021, during a parliamentary session, Cates warned schools against inviting LGBTQ rights charities Stonewall and Mermaids to provide counselling services as she felt that they taught "dangerous and contested extreme ideologies that don't have a basis in science".

Cates supported Suella Braverman in the July 2022 Conservative Party leadership election. Liz Truss won the leadership contest and became Prime Minister but resigned in October 2022. Cates endorsed Rishi Sunak in the subsequent October 2022 Conservative leadership election.

Personal life
Cates lives in Oughtibridge, a village near Stocksbridge, with her husband and three children. She is an evangelical Christian and met her husband while working on a voluntary project at their church in Sheffield. Her husband Dave is the managing director of software company Redemption Media and is the chair of the trust board overseeing the Peak Edge Academy Trust.

References

External links

Living people
Conservative Party (UK) councillors
Conservative Party (UK) MPs for English constituencies
Councillors in Sheffield
Female members of the Parliament of the United Kingdom for English constituencies
UK MPs 2019–present
21st-century British women politicians
21st-century English businesspeople
21st-century English businesswomen
English women in business
Alumni of the University of Cambridge
Alumni of Sheffield Hallam University
People educated at King Edward VII School, Sheffield
1982 births
21st-century English women
Women councillors in England
English evangelicals